Battle of Gaza may refer to:
 Battle of Gaza (312 BC), a battle between Egypt and Macedon
 Battle of Raphia or Battle of Gaza, a 217 BC battle between Egypt and the Seleucid kingdom
 Battle of Gaza (1239), a battle of the Barons' Crusade
 First Battle of Gaza (March 26, 1917), a Turkish victory over the British
 Second Battle of Gaza (April 19, 1917), a Turkish victory over the British
 Third Battle of Gaza (October 31–November 7, 1917), a British victory over the Turks
 Battle of Gaza (2007), a struggle between Fatah and Hamas
 Gaza War (2008–2009), a conflict between Israel and Palestinian groups
 2014 Gaza War, a conflict between Israel and Palestinian groups
 2021 Israel–Palestine crisis, a conflict between Israel and Palestinian groups

See also
 Gaza conflict (disambiguation)
 Gaza War (disambiguation)